Benenitra is a district of Atsimo-Andrefana in Madagascar.

Communes
The district is further divided into five communes:

 Ambalavato
 Ankilimary
 Benenitra
 Ehara
 Ianapera

Geography
Benenitra is situated at the Onilahy River.

References 

Districts of Atsimo-Andrefana